The Sweet Science may refer to:

 The sport of boxing
 The Sweet Science, a song by Vulfpeck
 The Dead Science (formerly The Sweet Science), an experimental pop band from Seattle, Washington
 The Sweet Science, a book by A. J. Liebling